Mississippi Highway 434 (MS 434) is a short state highway in western Mississippi. The route travels from U.S. Route 61 (US 61) near Nitta Yuma and travels eastward. After crossing a creek, the road travels northeastward and enters Delta City, and the route ends inside the unincorporated community. The route was constructed around 1951, connecting from US 61 to Delta City. An extension along a county road to US 49W existed from 1957 to 1967.

Route description
All of MS 434 is located in Sharkey County. In 2017, the Mississippi Department of Transportation (MDOT) calculated 220 vehicles traveling on MS 434 southwest of Durst Road on average each day. The route is legally defined in Mississippi Code § 65-3-3, and it is maintained by MDOT and Sharkey County, as part of the Mississippi State Highway System.

MS 434 starts at a three-way junction with US 61 near Nitta Yuma and travels eastward. The road travels across farmland, dips southwards near Ivy Road, and crosses Deer Creek. The route turns northeastwards and intersects School Road. Near Durst Road, MS 434 crosses a drainage ditch. At Cooper Road and Walnut Drive, the route turns east and state maintenance ends. In Delta City, MS 434 ends past Keth Road and Richey Road as pavement markings change. The road continues as Delta City Road, ending at River Road near the Sunflower River.

History
Around 1951, a paved road was constructed from US 61 to Catchings, which is also known as Delta City. The road was signed as MS 434 by 1958. About two years later, MS 434 was extended eastward along a county-maintained gravel road to US 49W south of Silver City in Humphreys County, which was decommissioned by 1967.

Major intersections

References

434
Transportation in Sharkey County, Mississippi